Zagóra  is a part of the village of Bełżec in the administrative district of Gmina Bełżec, within Tomaszów Lubelski County, Lublin Voivodeship, in eastern Poland.

In Zagóra, there is a unique over 200-year-old juniper tree, a notable local natural monument.

References

Villages in Tomaszów Lubelski County